Tikkakoski is a northernmost residential area of Jyväskylä, Finland, about  north of the city centre. It has a population of 6,000.

The Jyväskylä Airport, Aviation Museum of Central Finland, and a Finnish Air Force base, with the FAF Headquarters, the Finnish Air Force Academy, Air Force Band, and the C4I Materiel Command, are all located in Tikkakoski.

Gallery

References

External links

Neighbourhoods of Jyväskylä